Wedington Township is an inactive township in Washington County, Arkansas, United States.

A variant name was " Township". The township was established in 1886.

References

Townships in Washington County, Arkansas
Townships in Arkansas